Psychpanalyst and writer, Claude Delay (born 22 December 1934 in Neuilly-sur-Seine, is also the author of several biographies of Coco Chanel, the Russian poet Marina Tsvetaeva and the brothers Alberto and Diego Giacometti. The granddaughter of the surgeon and politician , she is the daughter of professor Jean Delay and the sister of the novelist Florence Delay of the Académie française

Biography

Hands 
Claude Delay has published some of her texts under the name of Claude Baillén or Claude Delay-Tubiana, Professor Raoul Tubiana, surgeon of the hand, being her husband.

In the biography written by Claude Delay, Giacometti, Alberto and Diego, l'histoire cachée, Raoul Tubiana intervenes in the last chapter to evoke Alberto Giacometti, whom he met in 1948 thanks to their common friend Jacques Audiberti, Before getting to know Diego. For his part, Claude Delay met Diego later.

On the occasion of the marriage of Raoul Tubiana and Claude Delay in 1972, Diego offered them "a bronze couple holding hands". For his part, Raúl Tubiana possessed a hand carved by Alberto; Diego then carved a hand of Claude Delay. "This is how we have bronze hands of the two brothers," says Raul Tubiana.

Works

Novels and memoires 
 Paradis noir, novel, Gallimard
 Le Hammam, novel, Gallimard, prix Lucien Tisserant
 Roger la grenouille, portrait-souvenir, Jean-Jacques Pauvert
 Les ouragans sont lents, novel, Éditions des Femmes
 Passage des Singes, éditions des Femmes, prix littéraire de Trente Millions d'amis

Biographs 
1997: Marina Tsvetaïeva, Une ferveur tragique, Plon, prix Anna de Noailles of the Académie française
2007: Giacometti, Alberto et Diego, L'histoire cachée, Fayard
1998: Zao Wou-Ki, Couleurs et mots, collections of interviews with Zao Wou-Ki and several authors, 
2013: Marilyn Monroe, la cicatrice, Fayard

External links 
 Claude Delay on Babelio
 Claude Delay : la dernière confidente de Coco Chanel on France Info
 Claude Delay on Éditions des Femmes
 Claude Delay on the site of the Académie française.
 Interview avec Claude Delay on YouTube

People from Neuilly-sur-Seine
1934 births
Living people
21st-century French writers
French biographers
French psychoanalysts
French women novelists
20th-century French women writers
21st-century French women writers
Women biographers